José Joaquim de Carvalho (born 6 March 1997), commonly known as Zeca, is a Brazilian professional footballer who plays as a forward for K League 1 club Pohang Steelers.

Club career
Zeca was born in Salvador, Bahia, and was a Bahia youth graduate. He made his senior debut while on loan at Ypiranga-BA in 2016, but later moved to Vitória and returned to the youth setup.

In 2017, Zeca moved abroad and joined Portuguese side Boavista, being assigned to the reserve team. He returned to his home country in 2019, signing for Goiás and being initially a part of the under-23 team.

Zeca was definitely promoted to the main squad for the 2020 season, and made his Série A debut on 12 August of that year, coming on as a late substitute for Vinícius Lopes in a 1–2 away loss against Athletico Paranaense. After featuring in a further two top tier matches, he was loaned to Série C side Criciúma.

On 17 February 2021, Zeca agreed to a contract with Oeste also in the third division. A regular starter, he moved to Londrina in the Série B on 29 September, and was an important unit as the club narrowly avoided relegation in the last round.

On 31 December 2021, Zeca signed for Mirassol. The following 27 March, after scoring six goals in the 2022 Campeonato Paulista, he was loaned to South Korean side Daegu FC until the end of the year.

On 6 January 2023, Zeca officially returned to the K League, joining Pohang Steelers on a permanent deal.

Career statistics

Honours
Londrina
Campeonato Paranaense: 2014

Operário Ferroviário
Campeonato Brasileiro Série D: 2017
Campeonato Paranaense Segunda Divisão: 2018
Campeonato Brasileiro Série C: 2018

Ypiranga-RS
Campeonato Gaúcho Série A2: 2019

References

1997 births
Living people
Sportspeople from Salvador, Bahia
Brazilian footballers
Association football forwards
Campeonato Brasileiro Série A players
Campeonato Brasileiro Série B players
Campeonato Brasileiro Série C players
Esporte Clube Bahia players
Esporte Clube Ypiranga players
Goiás Esporte Clube players
Criciúma Esporte Clube players
Oeste Futebol Clube players
Londrina Esporte Clube players
Mirassol Futebol Clube players
Daegu FC players
Brazilian expatriate footballers
Brazilian expatriate sportspeople in South Korea
Expatriate footballers in South Korea